John Taffe (January 30, 1827 – March 14, 1884) was a Nebraska Republican politician.

Biography
He was born in Indianapolis, Indiana on January 30, 1827. He passed the bar and moved to the Nebraska Territory in 1856, becoming a member of the Nebraska Territorial House of Representatives from 1858 to 1859 and as the president of the Nebraska Territorial council in 1860 and 1861. During the American Civil War, he enlisted and served as major in the Second Regiment of the Nebraska Volunteer Cavalry. Originally named Captain of Company "I", he was promoted to Major Jan 24, 1863, joining the Field Officers of the entire regiment.

He returned to Omaha, Nebraska, where he was elected to the Fortieth United States Congress from Nebraska. He was re-elected two times serving from March 4, 1867 to March 3, 1873. During the Forty-second United States Congress, he was the chairman on the Committee on Territories.

He resumed his practice of law, becoming receiver of the public land office in North Platte, Nebraska, where he died March 14, 1884. He is buried in Prospect Hill Cemetery in North Omaha.

References
 
 
 
 

1827 births
1884 deaths
Nebraska lawyers
Union Army officers
Burials at Prospect Hill Cemetery (North Omaha, Nebraska)
Republican Party members of the United States House of Representatives from Nebraska
19th-century American politicians
19th-century American lawyers